Queen's Park is a ward in Bournemouth, Dorset. Since 2019, the ward has elected 2 councillors to Bournemouth, Christchurch and Poole Council.

History 
The ward formerly elected councillors to Bournemouth Borough Council before it was abolished in 2019.

Geography 
Queen's Park ward covers the suburbs of Queen's Park, Malmesbury Park and Richmond Park.

Councillors 
Two Conservative councillors.

Election results

2019

References 

Wards of Bournemouth, Christchurch and Poole